The 1975 Texas A&M Aggies football team represented Texas A&M University during the 1975 NCAA Division I football season. The team was ranked second in the nation late in the season before losing its last two games. The Aggies finished as Southwest Conference co-champions with both the Texas Longhorns and the Arkansas Razorbacks. The three co-champions each finished with a 10–2 overall win–loss record and a 6–1 record against Southwest Conference opponents.

Season summary
The 1975 Aggie football team started its season with ten wins. Its tenth victory came on the day after Thanksgiving Day (Friday, November 28, 1975) over the Texas Longhorns at Kyle Field before a national television audience (ABC). The Aggies were ranked second in the nation after the game against Texas, but starting quarterback Mike Jay suffered a back injury in the 20-10 win over the Longhorns. The next game came eight days later, a Saturday, December 6, matchup against the Arkansas Razorbacks that had been rescheduled from its typical early November timeframe due to TV scheduling concerns. With Jay injured, Texas A&M backup quarterback David Shipman was called upon to play against Arkansas, who was ranked 18th in the nation. The Aggies were trailing 7–0 at halftime and they lost by a final score of 31–6.

Before the loss at Arkansas, Texas A&M had appeared to be headed for the Cotton Bowl. Instead, the sixth-ranked team faced the unranked USC Trojans in the Liberty Bowl. USC had been ranked in the top five teams nationally in early November, but they struggled late in the season and came into the bowl game with a 7-4 record. The Aggies suffered a 20–0 loss and finished the season ranked #11. The 1975 Liberty Bowl was the final game for USC coach John McKay, as his success had earned him a job with the NFL expansion Tampa Bay Buccaneers.

The 1975 team was bolstered by the play of four-year starter and running back Bubba Bean, who became the first Aggie featured on the cover of Sports Illustrated. Bean was selected to play in that year's Senior Bowl, where he caught an 82-yard touchdown pass. He rushed for 944 yards on the season and scored a team-high 8 touchdowns. Bean finished his college career with 2,846 yards rushing. Bean was selected by the Atlanta Falcons with the ninth pick in the first round of the 1976 NFL Draft.

Schedule

Roster

References

Texas AandM
Texas A&M Aggies football seasons
Southwest Conference football champion seasons
Texas AandM Aggies football